Clapham is a surname. Notable people with the surname include:

Aaron Clapham (born 1987), New Zealand footballer 
Arthur Roy Clapham (1904–1990), British botanist
Charlie Clapham, chairman of Southport Football Club
David Clapham (1931-2005), South African racing driver and motor sport journalist. 
Jamie Clapham (born 1975), English footballer.
Sir John Clapham (economic historian) (1873–1946), British economic historian
John Clapham (historian and poet) (1566–1619), English historian and poet
John Greaves Clapham ( – 1854 or later), Canadian business man and politician
John Peele Clapham (1801–1875), English magistrate and philanthropist
Mark Clapham (born 1976), British writer
Michael Clapham (born 1943), UK politician, Labour Member of Parliament
Victor J. Clapham (South African Scout Association) Scouting notable, awardee of the Bronze Wolf in 1976
William Clapham (or Clappan) (fl. 1747), Captain in the British Army

English-language surnames